Jozef Dravecký (25 July 1947 – 23 January 2023) was a Slovak mathematician and diplomat. Between 1991 and 2013, he served as the ambassador of Slovakia to Bulgaria (1993–1998), the Baltic States (2000 – 2005) and the Holy See (2007–2013). 

Dravecký was born in Spišská Nová Ves.  He studied Sciences at the Comenius University graduating in 1971. In 1973 – 1990 he was a professor of Mathematical Analysis at the university.

In 2010, Dravecký was awarded the Knights Grand Cross of the Order of Pope Pius IX by the Pope Benedict XVI.

His death, on 23 January 2023 at the age of 75, was announced by the Chairman of the Christian Union of Pensioners Peter Mach in a Facebook post.

References 

1947 births
2023 deaths
Slovak diplomats
Ambassadors of Slovakia to the Holy See
Ambassadors of Slovakia to Bulgaria
Ambassadors of Slovakia to Lithuania
Ambassadors of Slovakia to Latvia
Ambassadors of Slovakia to Estonia
Slovak mathematicians
Slovak Roman Catholics
People from Spišská Nová Ves
Knights Grand Cross of the Order of Pope Pius IX
Academic staff of Comenius University
Comenius University alumni